The seventh Cabinet of Kim Kielsen was the Government of Greenland in office from 29 May 2020 to 8 February 2021. It was a coalition minority government consisting of Siumut, the Democrats and Nunatta Qitornai.

It was dissolved on 8 February 2021 when the Democrats left the coalition following disagreement with the new leadership of Siumut over a proposed open-pit mine near the town of Narsaq.

List of ministers
The Social Democratic Forward has 6 ministers including the Premier. The centrist party Nunatta Qitornai has 1 minister, and the Democrats have 3.

|}

See also 
Cabinet of Greenland

References

Government of Greenland
Coalition governments
Politics of Greenland
Political organisations based in Greenland
Kielsen, Kim V
2016 establishments in Greenland
Cabinets established in 2018
2018 in Greenland
Greenland politics-related lists